Tomás Leónides López (born 27 June 1997) is an Argentine professional footballer who plays as a defender for Quilmes.

Career
López began in the ranks of Club Campito in 2005, prior to signing for Quilmes in 2011. He was moved into their senior side towards the end of the 2016–17 Primera División season, making his debut on 5 May 2017 against San Martín before going on to feature in the club's final three fixtures versus Atlético de Rafaela, Arsenal de Sarandí and Estudiantes as they suffered relegation. López subsequently made twelve appearances in his opening Primera B Nacional campaign, notably getting sent off on his second appearance in the competition versus Instituto in December 2017.

Career statistics
.

References

External links

1997 births
Living people
People from Curuzú Cuatiá
Argentine footballers
Association football defenders
Argentine Primera División players
Primera Nacional players
Quilmes Atlético Club footballers
Sportspeople from Corrientes Province